"See Ruby Fall" is a song co-written by Johnny Cash and Roy Orbison. The title is a play on the phrase "See Ruby Falls", which is painted on some Southern barn roofs to direct potential tourists to a well-known waterfall in Chattanooga.

Recorded by Cash at the Columbia Studios in Nashville, Tennessee, on August 20, 1969, the song was released as a single (Columbia 4-45020, with "Blistered" that was recorded two days earlier on the opposite side) in October.

On U.S. Billboard country chart, the single charted as a double-A-side, reaching #4. On the Hot 100, "Blistered" reached #50, and "See Ruby Fall" #75. (according to some sources, both songs reached #50).

Both "Blistered" and "See Ruby Fall" are part of Johnny Cash's album Hello, I'm Johnny Cash (out in January 1970).

Analysis

Track listing

Charts

References

External links 
 "See Ruby Fall" on the Johnny Cash official website

Johnny Cash songs
1969 songs
1969 singles
Columbia Records singles
Songs written by Johnny Cash
Songs written by Roy Orbison